Nine ships of the Royal Navy have borne the name HMS Ruby:

  was initially a 40-gun warship launched in 1652. She fought in the War of the Spanish Succession as part of a fleet under Admiral John Benbow. She was rebuilt in 1706 carrying between 46 and 54 guns. and captured in 1707 by the French ship Mars.
  was a 66-gun third-rate ship of the line, originally the French ship Rubis.  She was captured in 1666, hulked after sustaining storm damage in 1682 and broken up in 1685.
  was a 54-gun fourth-rate ship of the line launched in 1708. She was renamed HMS Mermaid in 1744 and was sold in 1748.
  was a 50-gun third-rate ship of the line launched in 1745 and broken up in 1765.
 HMS Rubis (1747), a 52-gun ship of the line, captured in 1747 and taken into service as HMS Rubis and condemned in 1748.
  was a 64-gun third-rate ship of the line launched in 1776 that served at Bermuda between 1811 and her breaking up in 1821.
  was an iron paddle tender launched in 1842 and sold in 1846.
  was a wood screw gunboat launched in 1854 and broken up in 1868.
  was an  composite screw corvette launched in 1876.  She was converted to a coal hulk in 1904 and renamed C 10. She was sold in 1921.
  was an  launched in 1910 and sold in 1921.

There was also , a 44-gun French privateer that HMS Ruby captured in 1694 and that the Navy sold in 1698. She became a merchantman and was lost at Mayotte in 1799.

See also

References

Royal Navy ship names